Penams are the primary skeleton structures that define the penicillin subclass of the broader β-lactam family of antibiotics and related compounds. They are bicyclic ring systems containing a β-lactam moiety fused with a five-member thiazolidine ring.  Due to ring strain and limitations on amide resonance, the structure is unstable and highly susceptible to catalytic cleavage at the amide bond. Benzylpenicillin (penicillin G) is the natural product parent that contains the penam structure.

Structure and Bonding 
Penams do not have flexible structures, due to their composition of rigid small rings. The four-membered ring and five-membered ring are not coplanar. Instead, the structure is locked in a puckered (i.e. bent) shape due to the pyramidal geometry of the bridgehead nitrogen. The pyramidalization (χ = 54°) and twist of the C-N bond (τ = 18°) is caused by the strain from the lone pair's exclusion from planarity with the cyclic rings and electrostatic repulsion effects. As a result, the distorted C-N bond causes misalignment the orbitals of the carbonyl carbon and the nitrogen lone pair that allow for resonance overlap. The amide C-N bond length is 1.406Å and displays greater single bond character than in noncyclic tertiary amides. The C-O bond length is 1.205Å which is shorter than C-O bonds in noncyclic tertiary amides.

Properties

Stability 
Penam's overall thermodynamic stability is based on the summation of ring strain destabilization effects (RSE) and amide resonance stabilization effects (ARE). Since the destabilization effects far outweigh the stabilization effects, penams are thermodynamically unstable and reactive to nucleophilic reactions that favor the cleavage of the β-lactam ring.

Ring Strain Effect 
Penams are primarily destabilized because of the large angle and torsional strains that are associated with the four-member β-lactam ring, whose internal bond angles are 90º. Based on the similar strain energies observed in penams and standalone β-lactam rings, the fused five-member ring likely does not contribute to the overall strain effect unlike its six-membered ring counterpart in cephams which helped reduce ring strain. As a result, ring-opening reactions, e.g., hydrolysis, are thermodynamically favorable for their ring strain relief.

Amide Resonance Effect 
Penams are stabilized by amide resonance effects. Unlike traditional tertiary amides which delocalize the nitrogen lone pair onto the carbonyl group's oxygen and result in double bond character at the C-N bond, the amide resonance in penam primarily occurs between the nitrogen and carbonyl carbon that's partially positive due to the inductive effect of the carbonyl oxygen. This is a result of the overlap interactions between the HOMO lone pair on nitrogen and the LUMO of the carbon. However, due to the pyramidalization of the nitrogen and the distorted C-N bond, the degree of amide resonance stabilization is lowered, with respect to planar amides such as the β-lactam moiety that have aligned orbitals for overlap.

Reactions 
Penams are reactive towards catalytic cleavage via hydrolysis because of the carbonyl carbon's propensity for nucleophilic attack. This is understood by its partial positive (electrophilic) character that results from the electron density being slightly withdrawn by the carbonyl oxygen atom and, consequently, the lack of conjugation between the nitrogen and carbonyl group. Although amide bonds are typically unreactive to cleavage because of its partial double bond character, the pyramidalization and C-N bond distortion make the amide bond in penams have a single bond character, which is more reactive to cleavage. Also, cleavage of the C-N bond is thermodynamically favorable, since opening of the β-lactam ring reduces ring strain.

Catalyzed Cleavage 
Ring-opening of penams can be acid- or base- catalyzed hydrolysis. Under acidic conditions, the water acts as a nucleophile that attacks the electrophilic carbon of the carbonyl group. Under basic conditions, the hydroxide acts as the nucleophile. In enzymes, the hydroxyl group of a serine residue acts as the nucleophile. Regardless of which nucleophilic species that attacks the electrophilic carbon of the carbonyl group, the nucleophile binds, creating a tertiary carbon intermediate. Electrons are transferred from the C-N bond and onto the nitrogen atom which acts as the leaving group. As a result, the C-N bond is cleaved, forming a carboxylic acid and secondary amine.

References

Beta-lactamase inhibitors
Sulfur heterocycles
Nitrogen heterocycles
Heterocyclic compounds with 2 rings
Ketones